Duggleby Howe (also known as Howe Hill, Duggleby) is one of the largest round barrows in Britain, located on the
southern side of the Great Wold Valley in the district of Ryedale, and is one of four such monuments in this area, known collectively as the Great barrows of East Yorkshire. Duggleby Howe is believed on the basis of artefacts recovered to be of Late Neolithic date, but no
radiocarbon dates are available. Howe as a place name is believed to have originated from the Old Norse word haugr.

The monument consists of a mound, the base of which was 120 feet (37 m) in diameter. The top of the barrow was apparently truncated at some point in the past, leaving an almost-level platform some 47 feet (14 m) in diameter. On this was constructed a post mill of medieval type.

The barrow lies within a roughly circular enclosure, approximately 370 metres in diameter, formed from interrupted ditches, and open to the south.
To the east of the barrow, one within the enclosure and one outside, are two ring ditches, believed to be of Bronze Age date. Although the barrow itself was long known, it was not until 1979 that the existence of the enclosure was confirmed using aerial photographs taken by D. N. Riley.

The barrow was first excavated in either 1798 or 1799 by the Reverend Christopher Sykes, but of his excavation no records remain. Beginning on
21 July 1890 J. R. Mortimer, under the sponsorship of Sir Tatton Sykes, excavated "an area of 40 feet square over the centre of the barrow, and a portion of the east side" over a period of more than six weeks. This excavation was re-assessed by Ian Kinnes, Timothy Schadla-Hall, Paul Chadwick and Philip Dean in 1983 to produce the interpretation presented below.

Phases

Phase I

In the first phase of activity at Duggleby Howe a shaft grave was
excavated and at the base of it was interred an adult male in a crouched
position accompanied by a Towthorpe bowl, flint cores and flint flakes.

Higher up in the fill of the shaft grave were interred an adult and an
infant, both in a crouched position. At the feet of the adult was placed
another adult's skull. The latter skull is referred to as 'cranium J' and evidence of blunt force trauma as a cause of death on both sides of the skull has led to the suggestion that it represents a very rare case of human sacrifice for British Neolithic funerary monuments.

Phase II

Once the shaft grave had been back-filled, the bodies of two adults, accompanied by
flint and antler tools, were laid in the hollow created by the settling of
the fill of the shaft grave.

Phase III

To the east of the shaft grave was then cut a shallow grave in
which was deposited another adult in a crouched position, accompanied by
flint arrowheads, flint flakes, a bone pin, and various implements formed
from boar tusk and beaver tooth.

The primary round barrow, composed of "clayey or earthy matter" was
then erected and in it were included the remains of four infants, three children, an adolescent and an adult. The mound was then completed 
with a layer of "small chalk grit" and a thinner layer of "Blue 
Kimmeridge clay".

Phase IV

Subsequent to the construction of the primary mound, 53 cremations were
inserted into the crest of it. None of the cremated remains were enclosed
in vessels, but instead occurred in heaps 6-18 inches (15-45 centimetres)
in diameter and 1-6 inches (2-15 centimetres) high. Because not all of
the barrow was excavated, Mortimer considered it possible that there were
equally as many cremations preserved in the untouched part of the mound.
The cremations were unaccompanied by artefacts except for three fragments
of burnt bone pin.

Phase V

The barrow was subsequently enlarged by the addition of "roughly
quarried chalk" to create the massive final mound.

Later the mound was used as the emplacement for a post-mill.

Kinnes and his colleagues see Duggleby Howe as a cemetery used
over a long period of time, representing a stratified funerary sequence for
the Late Neolithic. Roy Loveday has suggested, as did J.R. Mortimer, that in fact the many burials may represent instead a sacrifice to mark the death of a powerful figure, perhaps the individual found at the base of the original shaft grave.

Mortimer's excavation technique, although good for the time, did not
record the archaeological stratigraphy sufficiently well to allow this
question to be settled.

The Great Barrows of East Yorkshire
Willy Howe
South Side Mount
Wold Newton Barrow 284
Duggleby Howe

References

Kinnes, I., Schadla-Hall, T., Chadwick, P. and Dean, P., 1983, Duggleby Howe reconsidered, Archaeological Journal 140: pp 83–108
Loveday, R., 2002, Duggleby Howe revisited, Oxford Journal of Archaeology 21: pp 135–146
Manby, T. G., 1988, The Neolithic period in eastern Yorkshire, in Manby, T.G. (ed.) Archaeology in Eastern Yorkshire: Essays in Honour of T.C.M. Brewster. John R. Collis: Sheffield.
Maule Cole, E., 1902, Duggleby Howe, Transactions of the East Riding Antiquarian Society IX: pp 57–61
Mortimer, J. R., 1905, Forty Years Researches in British and Saxon Burial Mounds of East Yorkshire. A. Brown and Sons: London.
Riley, D. N., 1980, Recent air photographs of Duggleby Howe and the Ferrybridge henge, Yorkshire Archaeological Journal 52: pp 174–178
Schulting, R. J., 2012, Skeletal evidence for interpersonal violence: beyond mortuary monuments in southern Britain, pp. 223–249 in Schulting, R. J. and Fibiger, L. (eds.) Sticks, Stones and Broken Bones: Neolithic Violence in a European Perspective. Oxford: Oxford University Press

Prehistory of the East Riding of Yorkshire
Stone Age sites in England
Barrows in the United Kingdom
Archaeological sites in the East Riding of Yorkshire
Yorkshire Wolds